Raúl Vates Puig (born 28 February 1981) is a Spanish professional footballer who plays for CF Reddis as a midfielder.

External links

1981 births
Living people
People from Barcelona
Footballers from Barcelona
Spanish footballers
Association football midfielders
La Liga players
Segunda División B players
Tercera División players
RCD Espanyol B footballers
RCD Espanyol footballers
UE Lleida players
FC Barcelona C players
FC Barcelona Atlètic players
CF Pobla de Mafumet footballers
UE Cornellà players
AE Prat players
UD Barbastro players